Domenico Griminelli was a 17th-century Italian mathematician and Catholic priest from Correggio, Emilia-Romagna.

He published in 1656 a tutorial book on arithmetic for shopkeepers and merchants, Novissima prattica d'aritmetica mercantile ("Brand-new practice of mercantile arithmetic"), also known outside Italy and reprinted for two centuries. The book's introduction echoed Plato in declaring numbers to be a divine gift, without which civilization would vanish, and dedicated the work to cardinal Girolamo Gastaldi, the General Treasurer of the Apostolic Camera.

Works 
  Archive.org

References 

17th-century births
17th-century deaths
17th-century Italian mathematicians
17th-century Italian Roman Catholic priests
People from Correggio, Emilia-Romagna